The Church of Our Lady of Liesse is a church in Valletta, Malta. The church was built in 1740 on the site of a 17th-century church. The cupola was built to the designs of the Maltese Architect Francesco Zammit. The church is located near the shores of the Grand Harbour, close to Lascaris Battery and the site of the fish market. It is especially venerated by the people of the port area.

History
The first stone of the Church of Our Lady of Liesse was laid down on 21 November 1620, in a ceremony attended by Grand Master Alof de Wignacourt and many other members of the Order of St. John. The church was built with funds donated by Fra Giacomo De Chess du Bellay, who was the Bailiff of Armenia.

The church appears on the side of a 1664 sketch of the Barriera Wharf.

The church was completely rebuilt by the Langue of France in 1740, and was blessed by Bartolomé Rull. The church was consecrated by Bishop Vincenzo Labini on 23 November 1806.

The church was hit by German aerial bombardment in 1942 during World War II, but it was repaired and reopened on 21 February 1952. It was given to the Apostleship of the Sea on 15 September 1961.

The church
The church is built in the Baroque style. It has a dome and a belfry which was designed by Francesco Zammit. It has three altars.

The titular painting of the church depicts a legend about three knights and Our Lady of Liesse, and it was painted by Enrico Arnaux. The relics of the martyr St. Generoso are stored in the church, and they were transferred there from the chapel of Fort Manoel. A statue of the Virgin Mary which had originally been located at Fort Saint Elmo is now found in a niche in the church.

The church building is a Grade 1 national monument, and it is listed on the National Inventory of the Cultural Property of the Maltese Islands.

Gallery

Further reading
August 10, 1618.

References

OurLady of Liesse
Valletta OurLady of Liesse
Valletta OurLady of Liesse
Valletta OurLady of Liesse
Valletta OurLady of Liesse
Valletta OurLady of Liesse
Valletta OurLady of Liesse
Valletta OurLady of Liesse
Valletta OurLady of Liesse
17th-century Roman Catholic church buildings in Malta
18th-century Roman Catholic church buildings in Malta